Transportation theory may refer to:

 Transportation theory (mathematics)
 Transportation theory (psychology)